Alain Absire (born 1950 in Rouen) is a French writer, and winner of the Prix Femina, 1984, for L'Égal de Dieu.

Works 
He is the author of about 20 books published by Albin Michel, Calmann-Lévy, Julliard, Flammarion etc., his publications include:

Novels
1979: L'Homme disparu, Albin Michel
1983: Vasile Evanescu, l'homme à tête d'oiseau, Calmann-Lévy (Prix Libre 1984)
1984: 118, rue Terminale, Calmann-Lévy
1985: Lazare ou le grand sommeil, Calmann-Lévy
1987: L'Égal de Dieu, Calmann-Lévy, Prix Femina
1990: Baptiste ou la dernière saison, Calmann-Lévy
1995: L'Enfant-lune, Julliard
1997: Alessandro ou la guerre des chiens, Flammarion
1999: Les Noces fatales, Flammarion
2000: Le Pauvre d'Orient, Presses de la Renaissance
2002: Lapidation, Fayard
2003: La Déclaration d'amour, Fayard
2004: Jean S., Fayard
2007: Sans pays, Fayard
2014: Mon sommeil sera paisible, Gallimard

Short stories
1985: L'Éveil, Le Castor astral
1989: Mémoires du bout du monde, Presses de la Renaissance
1991: Les Tyrans, Presses de la Renaissance
2006: Au voyageur qui ne fait que passer, Fayard
2008: Saga italienne, NiL Éditions

Essays
2004: Alejo Carpentier, Julliard

Collections
2004: Lettres à Dieu, collectif, Calmann-Lévy

References

1950 births
Living people
Writers from Rouen
20th-century French novelists
20th-century French male writers
French literary critics
Prix Femina winners
French male novelists
French male non-fiction writers